The 1995–96 season was Ulster Rugby's first season under professionalism, during which they competed in the IRFU Interprovincial Championship and the inaugural Heineken Cup. Brian Bloomfield was in his second season as coach. 35-year-old Malone RFC centre Bill Harbinson, who first played for Ulster in 1986, was captain, in his final season before retirement from the game.

At this stage the Irish provinces were still representative teams, not professional clubs. Many involved in the game were concerned that domestic clubs could not afford to pay players, who could be lost to professional teams in England. In September, the IRFU confirmed that, for this season, only senior international players would be paid, with a one-year moratorium on payment for club and provincial players. Up to 35 Ireland players would be offered £26,000 contracts for the 1996 Five Nations Championship. That squad included Ulster players Jonny Bell, Allen Clarke, Jeremy Davidson, Maurice Field, David Humphreys, Paddy Johns, Denis McBride and Mark McCall. As the situation developed, match fees became available for Heineken Cup and Interprovincial matches, with players who appeared in all six matches in line to receive almost £3,000.

The Heineken Cup was launched in the summer of 1995 on the initiative of the then Five Nations Committee to provide a new level of professional cross border competition. Twelve sides representing Ireland, Wales, Italy, Romania and France competed in four pools of three with the group winners going directly into the semi-finals. English and Scottish teams did not take part in the inaugural competition. Ulster were beaten 46–6 away by Cardiff in their first Heineken Cup match. Cardiff, in common with other Welsh sides, had adopted the relatively new tactic of lifting in the lineout; Irish teams had not, and Ulster players were unable to deal with it. Their second and final match in the competition, at home to Bègles-Bordeaux, was close until the final five minutes, when, at 16–22, Denis McBride was stopped short of the try line. Soon after, Bègles-Bordeaux's Sebastien Loubsens intercepted an Ulster pass, leading to a try by Julien Berthe that put the French side too far ahead to catch. The match finished 16–29. Ulster finished bottom of the pool, failing to make the semi-finals. Toulouse went on to become the first European cup winners, beating Cardiff in extra time in front of a crowd of 21,800 at Cardiff Arms Park.

Ulster opened their Interprovincial campaign at home against defending champions Munster, winning 14–10 in an uninspiring encounter, with Richard Mackey scoring the winning try 12 minutes from time. The weekend after their heavy defeat to Cardiff in the Heineken Cup, they beat Connacht 27–9 in Galway, based on the hard work of their back row, Stuart Duncan, Paddy Johns and Denis McBride, and lock Davy Tweed's dominance in the lineout. They dominated the Irish Exiles at home, winning 29–3, and setting up a championship decider against Leinster. Leinster won their first Interprovincial title for twelve years with a 31–3 win at Donnybrook. Paul Wallace scored the opening try after fifteen seconds, and Leinster raced to a 22–0 lead in the first twenty minutes. Ulster had plenty of possession, with Paddy Johns coming close to scoring on two occasions before half-time, but Leinster defended strongly, and only conceded one Mark McCall penalty.

Players selected

Heineken Cup

Pool 2

IRFU Interprovincial Championship

Top three provincial teams qualify for next year's Heineken Cup.

Friendlies

References

1995-96
1995–96 in Irish rugby union
1995–96 Heineken Cup